This list consists of all major naval and merchant ships involved in Operation Dynamo, the evacuation of allied troops from the Dunkirk area from 26 May to 4 June 1940. The operation was administered by the British Admiralty with the Royal Navy providing the bulk of large vessels. They were accompanied by several other vessels of allied navies, most notably the French, as well as many merchant ships, some previously requisitioned and converted for naval use, and others called into service from their civilian roles due to the urgency of the situation. Hundreds of small privately owned craft, known as the Little Ships of Dunkirk, not listed here, were crucial in ferrying from the beaches to these larger vessels, whilst the majority of troops embarked directly at Dunkirk harbour.

Legend 

Name (Pennant Number)
Ships are listed in alphabetical order disregarding any ship prefixes, which are not used by the French or Belgians. Pennant numbers are provided in brackets where known. These were generally displayed on the ship's hull, though not on destroyer leaders such as  pennant D1. In May–June 1940 the Royal Navy was in the process of re-allocating the pennant numbers of many of its destroyers, in most cases the number remained the same whilst the initial letter (known as the flag superior) changed, with "D" and "F" becoming "I" and "G" respectively.
 
Flag
The ensign flown by each vessel to indicate its nationality. The civil ensigns of France and Belgium, as well as the naval ensign of France, are the same as their national flag, although with differing dimensions. The United Kingdom uses the White Ensign for all commissioned naval vessels and the Red Ensign for civilian vessels (collectively known as the  Merchant Navy). The Blue Ensign was used for non-naval vessels in Government service, for example hospital ships and troopships. There is some evidence they flew the Admiralty Ensign, now known as the Government Service Ensign.

Tonnage
Different measures are commonly used for the size of commercial and naval vessels: Gross register tonnage (GRT) is the total internal volume of commercial vessels, including those requisitioned and converted for naval use, whilst displacement is the weight of water displaced by the hull, used for naval vessels such as destroyers,  minesweepers and sloops. These are therefore not comparable.

Notes

Bibliography 

 Reports submitted to the Admiralty by the Commanding Officers of ships, flotillas and shore parties: ADM 199.786 and 788A-793 The National Archives (TNA), 1940
 
 
 
 
 
 
 
 
 
 
 

Dunkirk
Dunkirk evacuation